The North Shore of Long Island is the area along the northern coast of New York's Long Island bordering Long Island Sound. Known for its extreme wealth and lavish estates, the North Shore exploded into affluence at the turn of the 20th century, earning it the nickname the Gold Coast.  Historically, this term refers to the coastline communities in the towns of North Hempstead (such as Great Neck and Port Washington) and Oyster Bay in Nassau County and the Town of Huntington in Suffolk County, although the town of Smithtown east of here is also known for its affluence. The easternmost Gold Coast mansion is the Geissler Estate, located just west of Indian Hills Country Club in Fort Salonga, within the Town of Huntington.

Being a remnant of glacial moraine, the North Shore is somewhat hilly, and its beaches are more rocky than those on the flat, sandy outwash plain of the South Shore along the Atlantic Ocean. Large boulders known as glacial erratics are scattered across the area.

History

Colonial Era
The North Shore was first settled by Europeans in the mid-1600s. Much of the area was initially controlled by the Dutch colony of New Netherland. Towns in the eastern part of the North Shore were settled by the English under the jurisdiction of the New Haven Colony and Connecticut Colony. This arrangement ended in 1664 with the English takeover of New Netherland, when all of Long Island was transferred into the new Province of New York.

In its early days the North Shore was largely agricultural. Whaling was also a component of the early economy, as is commemorated in Cold Spring Harbor's Whaling Museum & Education Center.

Gilded Era

During the Second Industrial Revolution, great fortunes were made in steel, transportation and other industries. Beginning in the early 1890s, lavish private estates were erected on what became known as the "Gold Coast" of Long Island.

Among those were expansive faux chateaux and castles belonging to the Vanderbilts, Astors, Whitneys, Charles Pratt, J. P. Morgan, F. W. Woolworth, and others.  Otto Kahn's Oheka Castle was reputed to be the second largest private home in the United States, second only to the Biltmore Estate in Asheville, North Carolina.  Alternatively, some eschewed formal mansions and erected large shingle-style and clapboard "cottages", such as Theodore Roosevelt's Sagamore Hill.

The greatest architects, landscapers, decorators and firms were employed, including Stanford White, John Russell Pope, Guy Lowell, and Carrère and Hastings.  Architectural styles included English Tudor, French Chateau, Georgian, Gothic, Mediterranean, Norman, Roman, Spanish, and combinations of these.  Rooms, outdoor structures, and entire buildings were dismantled in Europe and reassembled on the North Shore.  Complementing the great houses were formal gardens, gazebos, greenhouses, stables, guest houses, gate houses, swimming pools, reflecting pools, ponds, children’s playhouses, pleasure palaces, golf courses, and tennis courts.  Activities such as horse riding, hunting, fishing, fox hunting, polo, yachting, golf, swimming, tennis, skeet shooting and winter sports, were held at the estates or exclusive clubs nearby such as the Beaver Dam Club, the Seawanhaka Corinthian Yacht Club (1871), Meadow Brook Club (1881), Manhasset Bay Yacht Club (1892), Piping Rock Club (1912), and Creek Club (1923).  Privacy was maintained with the huge land holdings, hedges and trees, fences, gates and gate houses, private roads, and lack of maps showing the location of the estates.

Post-War era
Following World War II many Gold Coast mansions were demolished and their estates subdivided into suburban-style developments. Only about 200 of the original 500 survive. As fortunes faded some of the largest or most prominent Gilded Era showpieces, such as Daniel Guggenheim's Gould-Guggenheim Estate, Theodore Roosevelt's Sagamore Hill, William Vanderbilt II's Eagle's Nest, the Alexander P. de Seversky Mansion, Otto Kahn's Oheka Castle, and John Shaffer Phipps' Westbury House were turned into museum homes, conference centers, and resorts. Others repurposed for non-residential uses include Herbert L. Pratt's  Glen Cove country home, "The Braes", turned into the Webb Institute, Walter Chrysler's Kings Point estate, "Forker House", turned into the United States Merchant Marine Academy, and U.S. Steel heir Childs Frick's "Clayton" the Nassau County Museum of Art.

Geography

Delineated perceptually by the Queens-Nassau border, the North Shore is marked by a series of necks (peninsulas) and populated harbors. North Hempstead, Oyster Bay and Huntington Towns comprise the land ownership of this area, which is noted for its preservation of Gilded Age Estates. Beyond here, the North Shore becomes Towns of Smithtown and Brookhaven, where a similar trend of peninsulas and sheltered harbors are the sites of hamlets and towns such as Stony Brook, Port Jefferson, Wading River, etc..

Once the island splits into two forks at its east end, the North Shore's hills largely flatten out (and enter the Town of Riverhead) to an out-wash plain and becomes largely rural (and enters the Town of Southold), with an economic stronghold on agriculture, particularly in the shape of wineries and vineyards. This recent trend, beginning in the 1980s with the conversion of potato farms, has given the North Fork the distinction of being the most productive agricultural area in New York State. Despite this, North Fork, contrasts starkly with the more populated and more well-known South Fork's Hamptons. The North Fork terminates at Orient Point, where the Cross Sound Ferry Company has a terminal for ferries bound for New London, CT. and Block Island, RI.

Greenport, a village in Southold midway between Orient and Riverhead, is a major economic center for the North Fork and as such, is the eastern terminus of the Long Island Rail Road's Main Line. The North Fork is also geographically tied to a separate township, Shelter Island, an island in the Peconic Bay accessible via ferry that leaves from Greenport, adjacent to the railroad station. The island also has a ferry on its south side that connects with North Haven on the South Fork.

In popular culture

In literature, the North Shore is the setting of F. Scott Fitzgerald's 1925 novel The Great Gatsby, which centered on the area's wealth and the aspiration of the title character to be accepted into its high society. The novel's "West Egg" and "East Egg" were fictionalized versions of the real North Shore villages of Kings Point and Sands Point, respectively. The Gold Coast by Nelson DeMille is a novel set in the area.  The distinctive upper class speech pattern known as "Locust Valley lockjaw" takes its name from the North Shore's Locust Valley area. The aristocratic cachet persists despite suburban infill converting much of the North Shore into commuter towns.

Extant Gold Coast estates
 Caumsett, formerly the Marshall Field III Estate
 Coindre Hall
 Delamater-Bevin Mansion
 Greentree
 Harry E. Donnell House
 Hempstead House 
 John E. Aldred Estate
 Killenworth
 Nassau County Museum of Art, formerly The Clayton Estate
 Oheka Castle
 Old Westbury Gardens
 United States Merchant Marine Academy, formerly Forker House
 Vanderbilt Museum
 Webb Institute, formerly The Braes
 Welwyn Preserve, formerly the Welwyn Estate

Demolished mansions 
Some mansions burned down, others that were abandoned were vandalized or overtaken by vegetation. Many were torn down to make room for developments, as the Great Depression, poor financial decisions, increasing requirements for upkeep, and increasing income taxes depleted family fortunes. Some of the notable mansions that are now gone are included in the table below with some of their features.

List of communities

 Asharoken
 Baxter Estates
 Bayville
 Belle Terre
 Brookville
 Calverton
 Carle Place
 Centerport
 Centre Island
 Cold Spring Harbor
 Commack
 Cove Neck
 Dix Hills
 East Hills
 East Setauket
 East Shoreham
 East Northport
 East Norwich
 East Williston
 Eatons Neck
 Elwood
 Flower Hill
 Fort Salonga
 Garden City Park
 Glen Cove
 Glen Head
 Glenwood Landing
 Great Neck
 Great Neck Estates
 Greenport
 Halesite
 Harbor Hills
 Head of the Harbor
 Herricks
 Huntington
 Huntington Bay
 Huntington Station
 Kensington
 Kings Park
 Kings Point
 Lake Success
 Lattingtown
 Laurel Hollow
 Locust Valley
 Lloyd Harbor
 Manhasset
 Manhasset Hills
 Manorhaven
 Matinecock
 Mattituck
 Mill Neck
 Miller Place
 Mineola
 Mount Sinai
 Muttontown
 New Cassel
 New Hyde Park
 Nissequogue
 North Hills
 North New Hyde Park
 Northport
 Oyster Bay
 Oyster Bay Cove
 Old Brookville
 Old Field
 Old Westbury
 Orient
 Plandome
 Plandome Manor
 Poquott
 Port Jefferson
 Port Jefferson Station
 Port Washington North
 Port Washington
 Ridge
 Rocky Point
 Roslyn
 Roslyn Estates
 Roslyn Harbor
 Roslyn Heights
 Saddle Rock
 Saddle Rock Estates
 Sands Point
 Sea Cliff
 Setauket
 Shoreham
 Smithtown
 Sound Beach
 Southold
 South Huntington
 Stony Brook
 Strongs Neck
 Syosset
 Terryville
 Thomaston
 Upper Brookville
 Wading River
 West Hills
 Williston Park
 Woodbury

See also
 The Hamptons, New York
 Gold Coast (Connecticut)
 Gold Coast (New Jersey)
 Gold Coast (Florida)
 List of glacial moraines
 Terminal moraine

References

Citations

General sources 

 AIA Architectural Guide to Nassau and Suffolk Counties.  American Institute of Architects. Long Island Chapter, 1992.
 Frelinghuysen, Alice Cooney. Louis Comfort Tiffany and Laurelton Hall: An Artist's Country Estate.  Metropolitan Museum of Art, 2006.
 Hewitt, Mark Alan. The Architect and the American Country House, 1890–1940. Yale Univ. Press. 1990.
 MacKay, Robert B.  Long Island Country Houses and Their Architects 1860–1940.  W. W. Norton, 1997.
 Mateyunas, Paul J. North Shore Long Island: Country Houses 1890–1950.  Acanthus Press, 2007.
 Mensing, Kenneth G. and Rita Langdon.  Hillwood: The Long Island estate of Marjorie Merriweather Post. Long Island University, 2008.
 Randall, Monica.  The Mansions of Long Island's Gold Coast. Rizzoli, 1979.
 Randall, Monica.  Winfield: Living in the Shadow of Woolworths.  Thomas Dunne, 2003.
 Sclare, Lisa and Donald.  Beaux-Arts Estates: A Guide to the Architecture of Long Island.  Viking Press, 1980.
 Spinzia, Raymond E. and Judith A. Long Island's Prominent North Shore Families: Their Estates and Their Country Homes Vol. 1–2.  VirtualBookworm.com, 2006.
 Wilson, Richard Guy.  Harbor Hill: Portrait of a House.  W. W. Norton, 2008.

External links

 Old Long Island - Dedicated to the preservation of Long Island's Gold Coast estates
 LIGC - Over 700 tags identifying Long Island's Gold Coast mansions and gardens at Wikimapia
 Gold Coast Mansions of Long Island, New York
 Long Island's Gold Coast Past and Present
 "Gold Coast Mansions"—episode of the PBS television documentary series Treasures of New York
 History, NYIT de Seversky Mansion

 
American upper class
Geography of Long Island
Geography of Nassau County, New York
Geography of Queens, New York
Geography of Suffolk County, New York
Long Island Sound
New York metropolitan area